Hari Vukas (born 6 October 1972) is a Croatian professional football manager and former player who is currently assistant to Olympique Marseille manager Igor Tudor.

Managerial career  
After having spells as head coach of Dugopolje, Zagora Unešić and Dinara, and as assistant coach of Primorac 1929 and Hajduk Split, Vukas was hired as interim manager by Hajduk following the resignation of Igor Tudor in February 2015. Soon he was named manager permanently but in May of the same year he was sacked and replaced by Damir Burić.

In the period between 2016 and 2018 Vukas worked as assistant coach to Igor Tudor at Karabükspor, Galatasaray and Udinese. On 12 June 2019, he was appointed head coach of Bosnian Premier League club Zrinjski Mostar, following the resignation of Blaž Slišković. Following a 0–2 away defeat against Zvijezda 09 on 2 November 2019, Vukas was fired from Zrinjski two days later.

On 23 December 2019, Tudor and Vukas returned to Hajduk Split; Tudor was appointed head coach, while Vukas his assistant. On 21 August 2020, following the appointment of Tudor as Juventus assistant coach, Vukas was named interim manager of Hajduk. On 8 September, it was announced Vukas would take on the role permanently. Following the dismisses of the advisor Mario Stanić and the director of football Ivan Kepčija by newly elected president Lukša Jakobušić, Vukas was fired from Hajduk on 4 November 2020.

Managerial statistics

Honours

Player 
Hajduk Split
Prva HNL: 1992
Yugoslav Cup: 1990–91 
Croatian Cup: 1992–93
Croatian Super Cup: 1994

References

External links
 

1972 births
Living people
Footballers from Split, Croatia
Association football forwards
Yugoslav footballers
Croatian footballers
HNK Hajduk Split players
NK Primorac 1929 players
NK Zadar players
HNK Segesta players
NK Zagreb players
HNK Cibalia players
R. Charleroi S.C. players
NK Troglav 1918 Livno players
NK Domžale players
Yugoslav First League players
Croatian Football League players
Belgian Pro League players
Premier League of Bosnia and Herzegovina players
Slovenian PrvaLiga players
Croatian expatriate footballers
Expatriate footballers in Belgium
Croatian expatriate sportspeople in Austria
Expatriate footballers in Bosnia and Herzegovina
Croatian expatriate sportspeople in Bosnia and Herzegovina
Expatriate footballers in Slovenia
Croatian expatriate sportspeople in Slovenia
Croatian football managers
NK Dugopolje managers
HNK Hajduk Split managers
HŠK Zrinjski managers
Croatian Football League managers
Premier League of Bosnia and Herzegovina managers
Croatian expatriate football managers
Expatriate football managers in Bosnia and Herzegovina
HNK Hajduk Split non-playing staff
Galatasaray S.K. (football) non-playing staff
Olympique de Marseille non-playing staff
Croatian expatriate sportspeople in Turkey
Croatian expatriate sportspeople in France